River Media was an Irish media group that was founded in 2005. It operated local newspapers and local news websites in County Donegal, County Londonderry and County Kildare.

River Media was based in Letterkenny, County Donegal, but it also had offices in Derry City, Dungiven, Buncrana, Donegal Town and Kildare.

In November 2018, it was announced that River Media had sold their 7 weekly newspapers to Iconic Newspapers.

Titles

Former newspaper titles 
Letterkenny Post (Sold to Iconic Newspapers) 
Finn Valley Post (Sold to Iconic Newspapers) 
Inish Times (Sold to Iconic Newspapers) 
Donegal Post (Sold to Iconic Newspapers) 
Derry News (Sold to Iconic Newspapers) 
County Derry Post (Sold to Iconic Newspapers) 
Kildare Post (Sold to Iconic Newspapers)

Former online publications 
Derry Now (Sold to Iconic Newspapers) 
Donegal Now (Sold to Iconic Newspapers)

References

External links 
 Derry Now
 Donegal Now

Irish companies established in 2005
Organisations based in Letterkenny
Publishing companies of the Republic of Ireland
Publishing companies established in 2005